{{DISPLAYTITLE:C33H38N2O}}
The molecular formula C33H38N2O (molar mass: 478.67 g/mol, exact mass: 478.2984 u) may refer to:

 RWJ-394674

Molecular formulas